The 1959 Vanderbilt Commodores football team represented Vanderbilt University in the 1959 NCAA University Division football season. The Commodores were led by head coach Art Guepe in his seventh season and finished the season with a record of five wins, three losses and two ties (5–3–2 overall, 3–2–2 in the SEC).

Schedule

References

Vanderbilt
Vanderbilt Commodores football seasons
Vanderbilt Commodores football